Domhnall Ó Madadhan, chief of Síol Anmchadha,  – after 8 March 1611.

Domhnall was the grandson of Breasal Ó Madadhan (died 1526) and a son of John Ó Madadhan, chief from 1554 to 1556. In 1567 he surrendered his Gaelic title and was in return appointed Captain of his Nation by letters patent from Elizabeth I. He thus became the first of the Madden family chiefs to recognise English law instead of Gaelic Brehon law, in return for crown protection of his title to his lands.

He attended the 1585 Parliament at Dublin. Despite most of the family rebelling during the Nine Years' War (Ireland), Domhnall himself did not participate. He was nevertheless lucky to escape the slaughter at Lusmagh Castle on 12 March 1595. During the winter of 1602–03 he attacked the followers of Dónall Cam Ó Súilleabháin Béirre. When he drew up his will on 8 March 1611 he did it under English law, settling his estate upon his eldest son while reserving some smaller properties for his younger sons and other heirs.

By his wife, Morne na Maigh O'Kelly of Creagh Castle (Ballinasloe) he had the following known issue:

 Anmchadh, called Ambrose, c. 1560 – 15 September 1636
 Malachy
 Donell

Pedigree of Domhnall
 Domhnall son of 
 John son of 
 Breasal son of
 Eoghan son of
 Murchadh Reagh son of 
 Eoghan Carrach son of 
 Murchadh son of 
 Eoghan Mór son of
 Murchadh son of 
Eoghan Ó Madadhan son of
 Murchadh of Magh Bealaigh son of 
 Cathal son of
 Madudan Óg son of
 Madudan Mór son of 
 Diarmaid son of 
Madudan Reamhar Ua Madadhan son of 
Diarmaid mac Madudan son of
Madudan mac Gadhra Mór son of
Gadhra Mór mac Dundach son of
 Dundach son of
 Loingseach son of
 Dunadhach of Sadinn son of
 Cobhtach of Grian son of
 Donnghallach son of 
Anmchadh mac Eogan Buac

References
 O'Madáin: History of the O'Maddens of Hy-Many, Gerard Madden, 2004. .

People from County Galway
16th-century Irish people
17th-century Irish people
Irish lords